The John Lynch Memorial Bridge crosses the James River as a link between Madison Heights, Virginia (Amherst County) and downtown Lynchburg, Virginia.  Prior to the construction of the Carter Glass Memorial Bridge, the John Lynch Memorial Bridge was the only bridge connecting the two areas.

References
Www.lynchburgparksandrec.com 

Buildings and structures in Lynchburg, Virginia
Transportation in Lynchburg, Virginia
Transportation in Amherst County, Virginia
Road bridges in Virginia